Cheating death is an English idiom. It may also refer to: 

 Cheating Death, one of the recurring segments on The Colbert Report
 Cheating Death (novel), a book by crime fiction writer H. R. F. Keating
 Cheating Death, a bestselling book by American neurosurgeon Dr. Sanjay Gupta
 "Cheating Death", an episode of Deadliest Catch
 Cheating Death (CSI: Miami episode), a Season 7 episode of CSI: Miami
 Cheating-Death, a discontinued anti-cheat solution

See also 
 The Man Who Could Cheat Death, a 1959 film